Abdul Rahman Katanani is a Palestinian artist born and living in Sabra refugee camp in Beirut, Lebanon. Katanani is a third generation Palestinian refugee; his grandparents left Yazour—a small town now called Azor—in Jaffa in 1948.

Early life 
Abdul Rahman Katanani was born in 1983, nine months after the Sabra & Shatila massacre. His first works of art were political cartoons, much inspired by Palestinian cartoonist and political critic, Naji al-Ali. In 2008 he received a Special Mention and in 2009 he received the Young Artist Prize during Salon d'Automne held by Sursock Museum in Beirut.

Education 
Katanani attended the Lebanese University in Beirut where he received a Diploma and Masters of Fine Arts. He has been a resident artist at Cité internationale des arts  in Paris, France. In 2016, he was a resident artist at Centre d'Art de Nanterre in Paris, France.

Work 
Katanani makes his art out of various materials such as scrap metal and barbed wire that he sources from within the camp. His artwork has sold in auctions by Christie's.

In 2016, Artnet News called Katanani one of "the strongest mid-career artists in the Arab world".

Collection 
Katanani's piece, "With Her Nephew, Ahmad" is a part of the permanent collection of Barjeel Art Foundation.

Exhibitions  
Katanani has held solo exhibitions and participated in group exhibitions in multiple countries. Some of them include:

Solo exhibitions

2016 "Children, Olive Trees & Barbed Wire", Al Markhiya Gallery; Doha, Qatar

2015 "Softness of a Circle, Knife Edge of a Straight Line", Agial Art Gallery; Beirut, Lebanon

2014 "Kids, Barbed Wire, and a Dream", Tanit Gallery; Munich, Germany

2012 "No Address", French Institute, Beirut, Lebanon.

2011 "Zinc, Barbed Wire, and Freedom", Agial Art Gallery; Beirut, Lebanon

Group exhibitions and participation

2016 "Jardin d'Orient", Arab World Institute; Paris, France

2014 My Beautiful Laundrette", Cite International des Arts; Paris, France

2012 "Together We Connect", Anima Gallery; Doha, Gallery

2011 "Rebirth"; Beirut Exhibition Center; Beirut, Lebanon

2011 "Isharat", Al Markhiya Gallery; Doha, Qatar

2009 Abu Dhabi Art

2009 Penang State Museum and Art Gallery; Penang, Malaysia

On Katanani's work 
In 2012 AbdulRahman Katanani and his work were featured in Christophe Donner's French documentary “Le Lanceur de Pierres رامي الحجارة” (The Stone Thrower).

References 

Palestinian artists
1984 births
Lebanese University alumni
Living people
Palestinian contemporary artists